Neomordellistena palpalis is a beetle in the genus Neomordellistena of the family Mordellidae. It was described in 1955 by Ermisch.

References

palpalis
Beetles described in 1955